The Scorpaenidae (also known as scorpionfish) are a family of mostly marine fish that includes many of the world's most venomous species. As their name suggests, scorpionfish have a type of "sting" in the form of sharp spines coated with venomous mucus. The family is a large one, with hundreds of members. They are widespread in tropical and temperate seas but mostly found in the Indo-Pacific. They should not be confused with the cabezones, of the genus Scorpaenichthys, which belong to a separate, though related, family, Cottidae.

Taxonomy
Scorpaenidae was described as a family in 1826 by the French naturalist Antoine Risso. The family is included in the suborder Scorpaenoidei of the order Scorpaeniformes in the 5th Edition of Fishes of the World but other authorities place it in the Perciformes either in the suborder Scorpaenoidei  or the superfamily Scorpaenoidea. The subfamilies of this family are treated as valid families by some authorities.

Subfamilies and tribes
Scorpaenidae is divided into the following subfamilies and tribes, containing a total of 65 genera with no less than 454 species:

 Subfamily Sebastinae Kaup, 1873 (Rockfishes)
 Tribe Sebastini Kaup, 1873
 Tribe Sebastolobini Matsubara, 1943
 Subfamily Setarchinae Matsubara, 1943
 Subfamily Neosebastinae Matsubara, 1943
 Subfamily Scorpaeninae Risso, 1826 (Scorpionfishes and lionfishes)
 Tribe Scorpaenini Risso, 1826
 Tribe Pteroini Kaup, 1873
 Subfamily Caracanthinae Gill, 1885 (Orbicular velvetfishes or coral crouchers)
 Subfamily Apistinae Gill, 1859
 Subfamily Tetraroginae J.L.B. Smith, 1949 (Sailback scorpionfishes or wasp fishes)
 Subfamily Synanceiinae Swainson, 1839 (Stonefishes)
 Tribe Minoini Jordan & Starks, 1904
 Tribe Choridactylini Kaup, 1859
 Tribe Synanceiini Swainson 1839
 Subfamily Plectrogeniinae Fowler, 1938

Characteristics
Scorpaenidae have a compressed body with the head typically having ridges and spines. There are 1-2 spines on the operculum, with 2 normally being divergent, and 3-5 on the preoperculum, normally 5. The suborbital stay is normally securely attached to the preoperculum, although in some species it may not be attached. If there are scales they are typically ctenoid. They normally have a single dorsal fin which is frequently incised. The dorsal fin contains between 11 and 17 spines and 8 and 17 soft rays while the anal fin usually has between 1 and 3 spines, normally 3, and 3 to 9 soft rays, typically 5, There is a single spine in the pelvic fin and between 2 and 5 soft rays, again typically 5, while the large pectoral fin contains 11-25 soft rays and sometimes has a few of the lower rays free of its membrane. The gill membranes are not attached to the isthmus. In some species, there is no swim bladder. There are venom glands in the spines of the dorsal, anal, and pelvic fins in some species.

Distribution and habitat
Scorpaenidae species are mainly found in the Pacific and Indian Oceans, but some species are also found in the Atlantic Ocean. Some species such as the lionfishes in the genus Pterois are invasive non natives species in areas such as the Caribbean and the eastern Mediterranean Sea. They are found in marine and brackish habitats. They typically inhabit reefs, but can also be found in estuaries, bays, and lagoons.

References

Further reading

External links

 Scorpaenidae entry on the Animal Diversity Web.
 Scorpionfish Rescue - Koh Phangan, Thailand

 
Scorpaenoidei
Venomous fish
Ray-finned fish families
Marine fish families
Taxa named by Antoine Risso